Henry Habib Ayrout, S.J. (1907 – April 10, 1969) was an author, educator, and Jesuit priest in Egypt.

His father Habib Ayrout was a Syro-Lebanese Egyptian architect practicing in Cairo, Egypt. After being educated in Paris as an engineer-architect, he participated in the planning and construction of Heliopolis (Cairo suburb).  His two brothers Charles Ayrout and Max Ayrout were also architects practicing in Cairo.

Fr. Ayrout was an educator and sociologist who established the Catholic Association for Schools of Egypt in 1940. His study of the Egypt's fellahin, The Egyptian Peasant, was first published in French in 1938 and is regarded as a major work on the subject. He was a noted advocate for land reform in Egypt.  Ayrout was rector of the Jesuit College in Faggala from 1962 until his death.  He was the founder of the Association of Upper Egypt for Education and Development.

References

Egyptian Roman Catholic priests
1907 births
1969 deaths
Egyptian people of Lebanese descent
Levantine-Egyptians
20th-century Jesuits